Kaloum  is an urban sub-prefecture in the Conakry Region of Guinea and one of five in the capital Conakry. Kaloum includes the city centre of Conakry. As of 2014 it had a population of 62,675 people.

When Air Guinée existed, its head office was in Kaloum.

Galerie

References

Sub-prefectures of Conakry